Baryancistrus is a genus of freshwater Loricariid catfish. They inhabit flowing sections of rivers, especially clearwater, in the basins of the Amazon (notably Trombetas, Tapajós, Xingu and Tocantins) and Orinoco (notably Ventuari) in Brazil and Venezuela.

Most Baryancistrus are differentiated from other related genera by a membrane connecting their dorsal fin and adipose fin, not present in most other genera.

The species of this genus are mainly herbivores and detritivores, but may take other foods in an aquarium setting. Most have probably not been bred in captivity. It is difficult to sex these fish, including adult specimens. These fish are mainly nocturnal, but will also emerge from their hiding places during the day, after some time getting accustomed to the aquarium. Adequate hiding places are recommended for these fish due to their primary nocturnal nature.

Species 
There are currently eight recognized species in this genus:

 Baryancistrus beggini Lujan, Arce H. & Armbruster, 2009 (Blue panaque)
 Baryancistrus chrysolomus Rapp Py-Daniel, Zuanon & R. R. de Oliveira, 2011
 Baryancistrus demantoides Werneke, Sabaj Pérez, Lujan & Armbruster, 2005
Baryancistrus hadrostomus 
 Baryancistrus longipinnis (Kindle, 1895)
Baryancistrus micropunctatus 
 Baryancistrus niveatus (Castelnau, 1855)
 Baryancistrus xanthellus Rapp Py-Daniel, Zuanon & R. R. de Oliveira, 2011 (Golden nugget pleco)

List of Baryancistrus sp. L-numbers 
Though there are many types of fish described as Baryancistrus, there are many that yet to be given a true scientific designation, and are only referred to under the L-number system, including the Gold Nuggets. Here is a list of Baryancistrus by L-number designation. The common name and scientific name are included when available, though some of these fish are only commonly referred to by their L-number. For those fish without a scientific name, they are assumed to be Baryancistrus sp.

* Note: L200 is also used to refer to Hemiancistrus subviridis, another Loricariid that is very similar in appearance to B. demantoides.

See also
List of freshwater aquarium fish species

References

Ancistrini
Catfish genera
Freshwater fish genera